"Falling Up" is a song by Australian singer and songwriter Dean Lewis. The song was released on 5 March 2021. 
 
In writing the song, Lewis tuned into lifelong feelings of frustration and anxiety, saying "I always thought I would be happy when I finished school or when I passed an exam, or I got a job or a promotion or if I went travelling and then I was like – 'ooh, now I have a record deal, what if I have a big song?'. Then, I had a big song, and I was on the road for three years and when I stopped, I realised it had all passed me by and I was actually less present and more anxious and stressed than ever. I looked back on my life and at all of these points along the way and I realised that I've never felt any better, it's always been onto the next thing, always moving."

At the 2021 ARIA Music Awards, the song was nominated for Song of the Year.

At the APRA Music Awards of 2022, the song was nominated for Most Performed Alternative Work.

Critical reception
Total Ntertainment described the song as "Emotive, impactful, relatable and impossible to forget, it's a masterclass in what the songwriter does best: connect."

Track listings

Charts

Weekly charts

Year-end charts

Certifications

References

2021 singles
2021 songs
Dean Lewis songs
Songs written by Dean Lewis
Songs written by Ben Kohn
Songs written by Peter Kelleher (songwriter)
Songs written by Tom Barnes (songwriter)
Song recordings produced by TMS (production team)